A by-election was held in the Cook Islands constituency of Ivirua on 21 January 2019. The by-election was called following the death of sitting MP Tony Armstrong.

The election was contested by four candidates: Agnes Armstrong, wife of former MP Tony Armstrong, for the Democratic Party; former deputy Prime Minister Teariki Heather for the Cook Islands United Party, Daryl Rairi for the Cook Islands Party, and independent Jason Teremoana. The by-election was won by Agnes Armstrong.

References

By-elections in the Cook Islands
Ivirua by-election
Ivirua by-election
January 2019 events in Oceania